Loose Women is a 1996 romance/drama film directed by Paul F. Bernard. Sherry Ham-Bernard wrote and starred in the production. Charlie Sheen, Renee Estevez, Keith David, Giancarlo Esposito and Stephan Lang made cameo appearances.

Cast 
Sherry Ham as Rachel
Melissa Errico as Gail
Marialisa Costanzo as Tracy
Corey Glover as Jack
Tom Verica as Det. Laurent
Amy Alexandra Lloyd as Ann
Robin Strasser as Mrs. Hayes
Renee Estevez as Make-up lady
Charlie Sheen as Barbie Lover Bartender
Keith David as Stylist

External links 
 

1996 films
1996 romantic drama films
American romantic drama films
1990s English-language films
1990s American films